Lauderdale is an unincorporated community located in the town of La Grange, Walworth County, Wisconsin, United States. The community is named for James Lauderdale, a member of the Wisconsin Assembly in 1853 and 1856. A post office was established in Lauderdale in April, 1881 by its first postmaster, Chester B. Williams.

Notes

Unincorporated communities in Walworth County, Wisconsin
Unincorporated communities in Wisconsin